Willem is a Dutch and West Frisian masculine given name. The name is Germanic, and can be seen as the Dutch equivalent of the name William in English, Guillaume in French, Guilherme in Portuguese, Guillermo in Spanish  and Wilhelm in German. Nicknames that are derived from Willem are Jelle, Pim, Willie, Willy and Wim.

Given name
Willem I (1772–1843), King of the Netherlands
Willem II (1792–1849), King of the Netherlands
Willem III (1817–1890), King of the Netherlands
Willem of the Netherlands (1840–1879), Dutch prince
Willem-Alexander (b. 1967), King of the Netherlands
Willem Aantjes (b. 1923), Dutch politician
Willem Adelaar (b. 1948), Dutch linguist
Willem Andriessen (1887–1964), Dutch pianist and composer
Willem Arondeus (1894–1943), Dutch artist and author, WWII Resistance member
Willem Barentsz (ca. 1550–1597), Dutch navigator and explorer
Willem Victor Bartholomeus (1825–1892), Dutch organist and conductor
Willem Bilderdijk (1756–1831), Dutch poet
Willem Blaeu (1571–1638), Dutch cartographer, atlas maker, and publisher
Willem Boy (1520–1592), Flemish painter, sculptor, and architect
Willem Breuker (b. 1944),  Dutch jazz bandleader, composer, arranger, and musician
Willem Brouwer (b. 1963), Dutch football (soccer) player
Willem Buiter (b. 1949), economist of the Bank of England's Monetary Policy Committee
Willem Claeszoon Heda (1594–ca. 1680), Dutch Golden Age still-life artist
Willem Cornelisz Schouten (ca. 1567–1625), a Dutch navigator of the Dutch East India Company
Willem de Kooning (1904–1997), Dutch-American abstract expressionist painter
Willem de Rooij (b. 1969), Dutch artist
Willem de Sitter (1872–1934), Dutch mathematician, physicist and astronomer
Willem de Vlamingh (1640–ca. 1698), Dutch sea captain and explorer of Australia 
Willem Dafoe (b. 1955), American actor
Willem Drees (1886–1988), Dutch politician
Willem Drost (1633–1659), Dutch Golden Age painter and printmaker
Willem Einthoven (1860–1927), Dutch doctor, physiologist, and inventor of the electrocardiogram
Willem Elsschot (1882–1960), Flemish writer and poet (pseudonym of Alfons-Jozef De Ridder)
Willem Endstra (1953–2004), Dutch real estate trader
Willem Frederik Hermans (1921–1995), Dutch author
Willem Holleeder (b. 1958), Dutch criminal involved in the kidnapping of Heineken president Freddy Heineken
Willem Hondius or Willem Hondt (1598–ca. 1652), a Dutch engraver, cartographer and painter
Willem Hubert van Blijenburgh (1881–1936), a Dutch Olympic fencer
Willem Jacob Luyten (1899–1994), Dutch-American astronomer
Willem Jacob 's Gravesande (1688–1742), Dutch philosopher and mathematician
Willem Janssen (footballer, born 1880), Dutch footballer
Willem Janssen (footballer, born 1986), Dutch footballer
Willem Janszoon (ca. 1570–1630), Dutch navigator and colonial governor
Willem Jewett (1963-2022), American lawyer and politician
Willem Johan Kolff (1911–2009), Dutch-American inventor of the artificial kidney
Willem Kes (1856–1934), Dutch conductor and violinist
Willem Kalf (1619–1693), Dutch Golden Age painter, art dealer, and appraiser
Willem Kieft (1597–1647), Dutch merchant and director-general of New Netherland
Willem Kloos (1859–1938), Dutch poet and literary critic
Willem Konjore (b. 1945), Namibian politician 
Willem Maris (1844–1910), Dutch landscape painter
Willem Meijer (1923–2003), Dutch botanist and plant collector
Willem Mengelberg (1871–1951), Dutch conductor
Willem Mons (1688–1724), brother of Peter the Great's mistress Anna Mons and secretary to Catherine
Willem Oltmans (1925–2004), Dutch journalist
Willem van der Oord, Dutch hydraulic engineer
Willem Pieterszoon Buytewech (1591—1624), Dutch painter, draughtsman, and etcher
Willem Pijper (1894–1947), Dutch composer, music critic, and music teacher
Willem Rebergen (born 1985), Dutch DJ and producer
Willem Roelofs (1822–1897), Dutch painter, water-colourist, etcher, lithographer and draughtsman
Willem Sandberg (1897–1984), Dutch typographer and museum curator
Willem Sassen (1918–2002), Dutch Nazi collaborator, Waffen-SS officer and journalist
Willem Siebenhaar (1863–1936), Dutch-Australian social activist and writer
Willem Surenhuis (ca. 1664–1729), Dutch Christian scholar
Willem Usselincx (1567–1647), Flemish merchant, investor and diplomat
Willem Valk (1898-1977), Dutch visual artist
Willem van Aelst (1627–1683), Dutch still-life artist
Willem van Biljon (b. 1961), South African entrepreneur and technologist
Willem van de Velde the Elder (ca. 1611–1693), Dutch painter
Willem van de Velde the Younger (1633–1707), Dutch marine painter, son of above
Willem van Hanegem (b. 1944), Dutch football player and coach
Willem van Mieris (1662–1747), Dutch painter
Willem van Otterloo (1907–1978), Dutch conductor, cellist and composer
Willem Verhulst (ca. 1625), the second director of the Dutch West India Company
Willem Verstegen (ca. 1612—1659), merchant of the Dutch East India Company and chief of factory in Deshima
Willem Willink (1750–1841), Dutch merchant
Willem Wilmink (1936–2003), Dutch poet and writer
Willem Wissing (1656–1687), Dutch portrait artist
Willem Witsen (1860–1923), Dutch painter and photographer

Middle name
Evert Willem Beth (1908–1964), Dutch philosopher and logician
Pieter Willem Botha (1916–2006), former prime minister and president of South Africa
Schalk Willem Burger (1852–1918), South African military leader, lawyer, and statesman
Herman Willem Daendels (1762–1818), 36th Governor General of the Dutch East Indies
Bernard Willem Holtrop, Dutch cartoonist who uses Willem as his professional name
Jan Willem Janssens (1762–1838), Dutch nobleman, soldier and statesman
Frederik Willem de Klerk (1936–2021), State President of South Africa
Pieter Willem Korthals (1807–1892), Dutch botanist
Hendrik Willem Lenstra, Jr. (b. 1949), Dutch mathematician
Hendrik Willem van Loon (1882–1944), Dutch-American historian and journalist
Vincent Willem Van Gogh, Dutch post-impressionist painter
Dale Willem Steyn, South African cricketer

Surname
Christophe Willem, contemporary French singer
Jean-Pierre Willem, founder of Medecins Aux Pieds Nus translatable as Barefoot Doctors

References

See also
 Willeke, a related Dutch feminine given name
Willems, surname of Dutch origin

Dutch masculine given names
Frisian masculine given names
Low German given names
Surnames from given names